Leuroglossus is a genus of deep-sea smelts found in the Pacific Ocean.

Species
Three recognized species are in this genus:
 Leuroglossus callorhini (F. A. Lucas, 1899)
 Leuroglossus schmidti Rass (ru), 1955 (northern smoothtongue)
 Leuroglossus stilbius C. H. Gilbert, 1890 (California smoothtongue)

References

Bathylagidae
Fish of the Pacific Ocean